Star Sector Atlas 2: The Mercantile League is a 1982 role-playing game supplement for Space Opera published by Fantasy Games Unlimited.

Contents
Star Sector Atlas 2: The Mercantile League is a stellar guide to the Antares Starsector, which gives a detailed account of Mercantile League history, the "Codes Duello" which dictate the League's judiciary system.

Reception
Jerry Epperson reviewed Star Sector Atlas 2: The Mercantile League in Space Gamer No. 70. Epperson commented that "Giving Star Sector Atlas 2 anything more than a qualified recommendation would be grounds for admission to a rubber room.  If you really want someone developing about fifty different stars, dumping them in your lap, and saying something like 'Here you go,' then buy it. It's much better than Star Sector Atlas I.  However, if you don't like to play editor before using a supplement of this nature, let it sit on the shelf."

References

Role-playing game supplements introduced in 1982
Space Opera supplements